The Tonkin Free School was a short-lived but historically significant educational institution in Hanoi that aimed to reform Vietnamese society under the French protectorate during the beginning of the 20th century.

History
The school was founded in March 1907, run by Lương Văn Can with the participation of many nationalists, including Phan Bội Châu and Phan Chu Trinh. It stemmed from the movement of the same name, which aimed to modernize Vietnamese society by abandoning Confucianism and adopting new ideas from the West and Japan.  In particular, it promoted the Vietnamese alphabet script for writing Vietnamese in place of classical Chinese by publishing educational materials and newspapers using these script, as a new vehicle of instruction. The schools offered free courses to anyone who wanted to learn about the modern spirit. The teachers at the school at 59 Hàng Đàn included Phạm Duy Tốn.

The school operated legally for several months before the French authorities closed it down in November.  In March 1908, a tax revolt in Annam and an attempted poisoning of French soldiers in Hanoi were blamed on the leaders of the school by the French. Subsequently, all the leaders were arrested and the school's publications were suppressed.

The school aimed at making the Vietnamese ‘modern’. It taught subjects like science, hygiene and French generally at evenings.

Main founders
Lương Văn Can
Đỗ Đức Anh
Đào Nguyên Phổ
Phan Tuấn Phong
Đặng Kinh Luân
Dương Bá Trạc
Lê Đại
Vũ Hoành
Phan Đình Đối
Phan Huy Thịnh
Nguyễn Hữu Cầu
Hoàng Tăng Bí
Nguyễn Quyền

See also
 Société d’Enseignement Mutuel du Tonkin
 Đông Du

References

Vietnamese independence movement
Schools in Vietnam
Defunct schools in Vietnam
Vietnamese writing systems
Vietnamese writers' organizations
Educational institutions established in 1907
1907 establishments in French Indochina